Joanne Wilson (born 1961) is an American businesswoman and angel investor. She is best known for backing female-founded companies.

Biography

Early life and education
Joanne Wilson was born in 1961. Wilson studied at Simmons College in Boston, where she graduated in 1983. She met her future husband Fred Wilson while in college and they moved to New York City.

Career 
Wilson began her career at Macy's, working there for 4 years in the retail apparel department. Her first job at Macy's was overseeing a cosmetics department. After Macy's she oversaw a company in the garment center, then worked in sales for the startup magazine and events company called Silicon Alley Reporter. She also chaired the nonprofit MOUSE (Making Opportunities in Upgrading Schools in Education), which focused on technology in inner-city schools.

Wilson turned to investing in 2007. She also runs the entrepreneurship blog Gotham Gal. Through her investment fund, Gotham Gal Ventures, Wilson and her husband fund startups.

In 2010, together with Nancy Hechinger from the New York University she co-founded and co-chaired an annual Women Entrepreneurs Festival.

From 2010 to 2015, she chaired the board of Hot Bread Kitchen, a nonprofit that promotes and trains female and minority bakers. She also was the first co-Chair of Path Forward, a non-profit, established in 2018 with a mission to get people back to work after they’ve taken time off for caregiving.

Since 2009, Wilson is involved in real estate development in New York City.

Investments
Wilson made her first investment into Lockhart Steele's startup Curbed. Some of her early investments included Food52, Rick's Picks, DailyWorth, Hot Bread Kitchen and Scoot. In 2014, she invested in Blue Bottle Coffee, a coffee roaster and retailer, and in Spoon University, a food media company, in 2015. Later in 2015, she invested in Nestio, the NY-based leasing and marketing platform for residential landlords.

Wilson became known for investing in women-led startups. In 2012, 13 of her 17 investments were in tech and out of those 13, 10 were women-founded companies. As of 2016, around 70 percent of her investments were in companies led by women. By 2017, she has backed more than 90 female-founded companies, including 3 of the 11 black women-led startups to have raised over $1 million.

In 2017, Wilson made two angel investments in the cannabis industry: Octavia Wellness and Beboe.

Personal life 
Wilson is married to venture capitalist Fred Wilson, a cofounder of Union Square Ventures. The couple live in New York City. They have three children, two daughters and a son. In 2016, Crain's New York Business included Fred and Joanne Wilson into its "Power Couples" list.

Bibliography

References

External links
 

1961 births
Living people
American investors
American venture capitalists
American women philanthropists
American women writers
Simmons University alumni
American women investors
21st-century American businesswomen
21st-century American businesspeople
Angel investors